Ashton Common is a hamlet in Wiltshire, England, located on Common Hill a little south of the A350 road. The hamlet belongs to the civil parish of Steeple Ashton.

External links

Hamlets in Wiltshire